Paul Glennon is a Canadian writer. He was a shortlisted nominee for the ReLit Award in 2001 for his short story collection How Did You Sleep?, and for the Governor General's Award for English-language fiction in 2006 for The Dodecahedron, or A Frame for Frames.

He has since published the Bookweird trilogy of young adult fantasy novels. He won a Sunburst Award in 2011 for Bookweirder, the second book in the trilogy.

Glennon is based in Ottawa, Ontario, and has worked in the city's information technology industry.

Works
How Did You Sleep? (2000)
The Dodecahedron, or A Frame for Frames (2005)
Bookweird (2008)
Bookweirder (2010)
Bookweirdest (2012)

References

External links
Paul Glennon

Canadian male novelists
21st-century Canadian novelists
Canadian male short story writers
Canadian fantasy writers
Canadian writers of young adult literature
Writers from Ottawa
Living people
21st-century Canadian short story writers
21st-century Canadian male writers
Year of birth missing (living people)